In geometry, sphere packing in a cube is a three-dimensional sphere packing problem with the objective of packing spheres inside a cube. It is the three-dimensional equivalent of the circle packing in a square problem in two dimensions. The problem consists of determining the optimal packing of a given number of spheres inside the cube.

See also 

 Packing problem
 Sphere packing in a cylinder

References
 

Packing problems
Spheres
Cubes